Mr Justice Choudry could refer to:
 Anup Singh Choudry, judge of the High Court of Uganda 2008–2014
 Akhlaq Choudhury, judge of the High Court of England and Wales since 2017